Gymnopilus galerinopsis is a species of mushroom in the family Hymenogastraceae. It is found in the state of Veracruz, Mexico.

See also

List of Gymnopilus species

References

External links
Gymnopilus galerinopsis at Index Fungorum

galerinopsis